The 2006 Segunda División Peruana (Peruvian Second Division) season was the 61st edition of the second tier of Association football governed by the Federación Peruana de Futbol. For the first time ever, the Peruvian second tier became a nationwide league, 40 years after the first tier had expanded to the entire nation. There were 12 teams in play on a home-and-away round-robin cycle. Deportivo Municipal, won the tournament and was promoted to the 2007 Peruvian First Division. Curibamba and Defensor Villa del Mar were in last places of the tournament and were relegated to the 2007 Copa Perú.

Teams

Table

Standings

Results

References

External links
 RSSSF

 

Peruvian Segunda División seasons
Peru2
2006 in Peruvian football